Silver permanganate is an inorganic compound with the chemical formula AgMnO4. This salt is a purple crystal adopting monoclinic crystal system. It decomposes when heated or mixed with water, and heating to high temperature may lead to explosion. The compound is used in gas masks.

Production
It can be produced through the reaction of silver nitrate and potassium permanganate:
 +  →  +

References

Silver compounds
Permanganates